The Stirling Homex Corporation, based in Avon, New York (near Rochester), came to prominence in 1970 promising to build housing at a lower cost with a new modular construction method. Promoters called chairman David Stirling the "Henry Ford of the housing industry." The company gained media attention and attracted almost $40 million from investors. 

Unfortunately, the company's apparent success was based on accounting irregularities and it went bankrupt in 1972. In 1975 the company's executives were charged with fraud and conspiracy and in 1977 four of them were sentenced to short prison terms by federal judge Marvin E. Frankel.

The story of the company figured prominently in Eleanor Dienstag's 1976 memoir Whither Thou Goest.

References
 Robert J. Cole, "U.S. Says Stirling Homex Reported Phantom Sales," New York Times, 3 July 1975, p. 1.
 Eleanor Dienstag, Whither Thou Goest: The Story of an Uprooted Wife (New York: Dutton, 1976).
 Arnold H. Lubasch, "Prison Sentences Pronounced for 4 at Stirling Homex," New York Times, 12 March 1977, p. 34.
 "Enron Too Shall Pass," blog post, 19 February 2002, The Motley Fool (https://www.fool.com/archive/portfolios/rulebreaker/2002/02/19/enron-too-shall-pass.aspx).
 Arhat Bhagwatkar, "Cash is king! An interesting study of Stirling Homex and its downfall," 27 May 2020 (https://medium.com/@arhatbhagwatkar/cash-is-king-762f75c48520)

Real estate companies of the United States